Roman Zakrzewski (1955 in Oświęcim – 25 December 2014) was a Polish painter. After beginning his artistic education in high school in Bielsko-Biała, he graduated from the Academy of Fine Arts in Cracow and in 1985 from Jerzy Nowosielski studio. He lived and worked in Kraków.

The main subject of Zakrzewski's paintings is a woman's portrait that represents classical values. Exhibitions of his works have been presented in Bielsko-Biała, Kraków, Rzeszów, Warsaw, and the United States.

Notable exhibitions
 "Jerzy Nowosielski i jego uczniowie" [Jerzy Nowosielski and his former students], The Forum Gallery, Kraków, Poland (1986)
 Paint exhibition in ART-CLUB, Kraków, Poland (1996)
 Paint exhibition in Katarzyna Napiórkowska Gallery, Warsaw, Poland (1997–2004)
 "Jerzy Nowosielski i jego uczniowie", The Sukiennice Gallery, Kraków, Poland (1999)
 Paint exhibition in The Town Museum, Bielsko-Biała, Poland (2002)
 Paint exhibition in Wanda Siemaszkowa Theatre, Rzeszów, Poland (2004)

References

External links

1955 births
2014 deaths
20th-century Polish painters
20th-century Polish male artists
21st-century Polish painters
21st-century male artists
Polish portrait painters
Polish male painters